West Baton Rouge Parish School Board is a school district headquartered in unincorporated West Baton Rouge Parish, Louisiana, United States. The district serves West Baton Rouge Parish.

School uniforms
On March 17, 1999 the school board established a new rule requiring all students to wear school uniforms, taking into effect in the 2000-2001 school year.

Schools

High schools
 Brusly High School  (Brusly)
 Port Allen High School  (Port Allen)

Middle schools
4-8
 Devall Middle School (Unincorporated area)
5-8
 Port Allen Middle School (Port Allen)
6-8
 Brusly Middle School (Brusly)

Caneview k-8 opened in January 2020. Combined Devall middle and chamberlain elementary

Elementary schools
3-5
 Lukeville Upper Elementary School (Unincorporated area)
2-4
 Cohn Elementary School (Port Allen)
PreK-3
 Chamberlin Elementary School (Unincorporated area)
PreK-2
 Brusly Elementary School (Brusly)
PreK-1
 Port Allen Elementary School (Port Allen)

References

External links
 West Baton Rouge Parish School Board

School districts in Louisiana
Education in West Baton Rouge Parish, Louisiana